Joseph Jadrzejczak, known as Joseph Jadrejak (born 20 February 1918 in Gladbeck, Westphalia, Germany - died 24 November 1990 in Saint-André-lez-Lille), was a French international footballer and manager who played as a defender and was part of the famed Lille team of the late 1940s.

Biography 
He moved to France with his family when he was two years old.  

In the 1969–70 season, Jadrejak rejoined Lille as a manager, succeeding Daniel Langrand.

Sporting career

Player 
 1930–36 : Houdain
 1936–37 : Divion
 1937–39 : Bruay
 1939–44 : SC Fives
 1944–45 : Lille OSC
 1945–46 : Lille OSC
 1946–47 : Lille OSC
 1947–48 : Lille OSC
 1948–49 : Lille OSC
 1949–50 : Lille OSC

Manager 
 1969–70 : Lille OSC

Honours 

 French champions : 1946 Lille OSC
 Coupe de France winners : 1946, 1947, 1948 Lille OSC
 Coupe de France finalists : 1941 SC Fives

France 
 Caps: 3.
 1st cap on 26 May 1947 (Paris, Stade Olympique Yves-du-Manoir) : France-Netherlands : 4-0.

External links 
  Joseph Jadrejak page on the official French Football Federation site

French footballers
France international footballers
German emigrants to France
Lille OSC players
Ligue 1 players
French football managers
Lille OSC managers
1918 births
1990 deaths

Association football defenders
SC Fives players